Baikunthpur is one of the 90 Legislative Assembly constituencies of Chhattisgarh state in India. It is in Koriya district and is a part of the Korba Lok Sabha constituency.

Members of the Legislative Assembly 

In the 2013 Chhattisgarh Legislative Assembly election, Bhaiyalal Rajwade had defeated Indian National Congress candidate Bedanti Tivari. Rajwade had defeated Tivari in the 2008 Chhattisgarh Legislative Assembly election as well. In the Chhattisgarh Legislative Assembly election, 2003, INC candidate Dr. Ram Chandra Singh Dev had emerged as the winner defeating Rajwade.

Election results

2018

See also
List of constituencies of the Chhattisgarh Legislative Assembly
Koriya district

References

Koriya district
Assembly constituencies of Chhattisgarh